Jiwaji University (JU) is a public affiliating university in Gwalior, Madhya Pradesh, India. The name comes from Jivajirao Scindia of Gwalior. The university was established on 23 May 1964 and Sarvepalli Radhakrishnan, the President of India, laid the foundation stone of the campus on 11 December 1964. It is fully accredited by the Government of India.

History
The university started its post-graduate teaching and research from the session 1966–67 with the establishment of Schools of Studies (SOS) in Botany and Zoology. The Schools of Studies in Physics, Chemistry and Ancient History, Culture and Archaeology were started from the session 1969–70. The School of Studies in Economics and Mathematics came into existence in 1978–79.

The School of Studies in Commerce started in 1980–81 and that of Biochemistry from the session 1986-87. The School of Studies in Computer Science, Engineering & Applications started from the session 1995–96 and running MCA and BCA courses. Established in 2000, the Institute of Engineering Jiwaji University is Jiwaji and Rajeev Gandhi Technical University affiliated college of Engineering.

Vice chancellors
S. S. Bhandarkar
R. G. Rajwade	
G. N. Tandon	
Har Swarup	
K. K. Tiwari	
K. K, Singh	
P. S. Bisen	
R. R. Das	
V. P. Saxena	
Satya Prakash	
Mayank Bakna
Priya Singh Parihar
D. C. Tiwari	
Hoshiyar Singh	
O. P. Agarwal	
A. K. Kapoor	
Shashi Prabha	
M. Kidwai
J. N. Gautam
Sangeeta Sukla

Affiliated colleges
Its jurisdiction extends over 8 districts -Ashoknagar,Bhind,Datia,Guna,Gwalior,Morena,Shivpuri,Sheopur .

Courses
The most special department is SOS in Neuroscience which conducts India's only Department of Biotechnology-sponsored neuroscience teaching program at the university level. It was started by the Department of Biotechnology, New Delhi and has many projects in collaboration with CSIR, ICMR, DBT, DST, DRDO and UGC labs and R&D. There are 10 seats per year and the meritorious students are provided with Rs, 5,000 monthly DBT studentship.

JU started an MBA course under the School of Studies in Commerce from the session 1987.  School of Studies in Library and Information Science was established in 1986 and School of Studies in Earth Science in 1991. The university established a centre of foreign language in 1986, which offers diploma and certificate courses in English, French, German and Russian. The Indira Gandhi Academy of Environment Education, on interdisciplinary programmes of environment and Ecoplanning was established in 1989. A centre for M. Phil Studies in Sociology and Political Science was established in 1990. The Institute of Engineering, the technical education centre of university, started in 2000. Most of the students of the institute are working in MNCs like L&T Infotech, IBM, Patni, Accenture, Microsoft, and Google.

The schools are around the central administrative block, leading to close relation between the university and the associated schools.

Faculties and schools
School of Studies in Engineering and Technology, Institute of Engineering
Faculty of Arts
School of Studies in Library and Information Science
Faculty of Commerce and Management
School of Studies in Commerce
School of Studies in Management
School of Studies in Tourism Administration
Faculty of Life Science
Indira Gandhi Academy of Environment Education Research and Ecoplanning
School of Studies in Biochemistry
School of Studies in Biotechnology
School of Studies in Microbiology
School of Studies in Biomedical Technology
School of Studies in Botany
School of Studies in Zoology
School of Studies in Molecular and Human Genetics
School of Studies in Neuroscience
Institute of Ethnobiology
Faculty of Science
School of Studies in Earth science
School of Studies in Computer Science & Application 
School of Studies in Chemistry
School of studies in Environment Chemistry
School of Studies in Marketing Management (MBACSM)
School of Mathematics and Allied Science
School of Studies in Physics
School of Studies in Jyotrivigyan
School of Studies in Law
School of Studies in Pharmaceutical Science
Faculty of Social Science
School of Studies in Ancient Indian History Culture and Archeology
School of Studies in Economics
School of Studies in Political Science
School of Studies in Life Long Education Extension and Social Work
Faculty of Physical Education
School of Studies in Physical Education & Sports Science
Tansen Institute of Performing Arts
Faculty of Distance Education
Institute of Distance Education

Notable alumni
 Umesh Varshney, Molecular biologist and Shanti Swarup Bhatnagar laureate
 Manmohan Parida, virologist, N-Bios laureate
 Narendra Singh Tomar, politician and cabinet minister of Government of India
 Rajinder Garg, horticulturalist and politician

See also
 Aditya College
 Mahadji Scindia Sports Complex

References

External links
Jiwaji University Official Website

 
Universities and colleges in Gwalior
Educational institutions established in 1964
1964 establishments in India